Jang Dong-shin(Korean:장동신) (born 10 January 1976) is a South Korean ice sledge hockey player and wheelchair fencer.

As a sledge hockey player, he played in the 2010, 2014, 2018 and 2022 Paralympic Winter Games. He won a silver medal at the 2012 IPC Ice Sledge Hockey World Championships.

References

External links 
 

1976 births
Living people
South Korean sledge hockey players
South Korean male fencers
Paralympic sledge hockey players of South Korea
Paralympic bronze medalists for South Korea
Ice sledge hockey players at the 2010 Winter Paralympics
Ice sledge hockey players at the 2014 Winter Paralympics
Para ice hockey players at the 2018 Winter Paralympics
Para ice hockey players at the 2022 Winter Paralympics
Medalists at the 2018 Winter Paralympics
Paralympic medalists in sledge hockey
People from Dongducheon
Sportspeople from Gyeonggi Province